Stefan Koychev Hristov (born 12 July 1985 in Stara Zagora) is a Bulgarian road racing cyclist, who most recently rode for Bulgarian amateur team Hemus 1896–Vereya. He competed in the road race at the 2016 Summer Olympics.

Major results

2006
 6th Overall Tour of Bulgaria
 10th Overall Tour of Greece
 10th Overall Giro delle Regioni
2008
 2nd Road race, National Road Championships
 4th Overall Tour of Bulgaria
1st Mountains classification
2010
 1st Overall Tour of Trakya
1st Stages 1 & 4
 4th Overall Tour of Marmara
1st Stage 4
 4th Overall Tour of Victory
2012
 1st Grand Prix Dobrich II
 7th Grand Prix Dobrich I
2013
 5th Overall Tour of Bulgaria
1st Stage 5
 8th Overall Tour of Szeklerland
2014
 1st  Time trial, National Road Championships
 1st Overall Tour of Szeklerland
1st Stages 2 & 3a (ITT)
 5th Overall Tour de Serbie
2015
 1st Overall Tour of Bulgaria
1st  Mountains classification
1st Stage 2
 2nd Road race, National Road Championships
 5th Overall International Tour of Torku Mevlana
 7th Overall Tour of Mersin
 7th Overall Tour of Black Sea
 7th Overall Tour of Aegean
 9th Overall Tour of Szeklerland
2016
 Tour de Serbie
1st  Mountains classification
1st  Bora Ivkovic Memorial Trophy
 3rd Overall Tour of Mersin
 10th Overall Tour of Bihor
2018
 National Road Championships
3rd Road race
3rd Time trial

References

External links

1985 births
Living people
Bulgarian male cyclists
Cyclists at the 2016 Summer Olympics
Olympic cyclists of Bulgaria
Sportspeople from Stara Zagora
European Games competitors for Bulgaria
Cyclists at the 2015 European Games